Lampanyctus is a genus of lanternfishes.

Species 
There are currently 39 recognized species in this genus:
 Lampanyctus acanthurus Wisner, 1974 (Spinytail lampfish)
 Lampanyctus achirus Andriashev, 1962 (Cripplefin Lanternfish)
 Lampanyctus alatus Goode & T. H. Bean, 1896 (Winged lanternfish)
 Lampanyctus ater Tåning, 1928 (Dusky lanternfish)
 Lampanyctus australis Tåning, 1932 (Southern lanternfish)
 Lampanyctus bristori Zahuranec, 2000
 Lampanyctus crocodilus (A. Risso, 1810) (Jewel lanternfish)
 Lampanyctus crypticus Zahuranec, 2000
 Lampanyctus cuprarius Tåning, 1928
 Lampanyctus festivus Tåning, 1928 (Festive lanternfish)
 Lampanyctus gibbsi Zahuranec, 2000
 Lampanyctus hawaiiensis Zahuranec, 2000
 Lampanyctus hubbsi Wisner, 1963
 Lampanyctus idostigma A. E. Parr, 1931
 Lampanyctus indicus Zahuranec, 2000
 Lampanyctus intricarius Tåning, 1928 (Diamondcheek lanternfish)
 Lampanyctus isaacsi Wisner, 1971
 Lampanyctus iselinoides W. A. Bussing, 1965
 Lampanyctus jordani C. H. Gilbert, 1913 (Brokenline lanternfish)
 Lampanyctus lepidolychnus Becker, 1967 (Mermaid lanternfish)
 Lampanyctus lineatus Tåning, 1928
 Lampanyctus macdonaldi (Goode & T. H. Bean, 1896) (Rakery beaconlamp)
 Lampanyctus macropterus (A. B. Brauer, 1904)
 Lampanyctus niger Günther, 1887 (Black lanternfish)
 Lampanyctus nobilis Tåning, 1928 (Noble lampfish)
 Lampanyctus omostigma C. H. Gilbert, 1908
 Lampanyctus parvicauda A. E. Parr, 1931 (Slimtail lampfish)
 Lampanyctus photonotus A. E. Parr, 1928
 Lampanyctus phyllisae Zahuranec, 2000
 Lampanyctus pusillus (J. Y. Johnson, 1890) (Pygmy lanternfish)
 Lampanyctus regalis Gilbert, 1892) (Pinpoint lampfish)
 Lampanyctus ritteri Gilbert, 1915) (Broadfin lampfish)
 Lampanyctus simulator Wisner, 1971
 Lampanyctus steinbecki Bolin, 1939 (Longfin lampfish)
 Lampanyctus tenuiformis (A. B. Brauer, 1906)
 Lampanyctus turneri (Fowler, 1934)
 Lampanyctus vadulus Hulley, 1981
 Lampanyctus wisneri Zahuranec, 2000

References

 
Extant Miocene first appearances
Marine fish genera
Taxa named by Charles Lucien Bonaparte